The Bronze Buckaroo is a 1939 American Western film directed by Richard C. Kahn. It is one of the race films made by African-American performers for African-American audiences. The Bronze Buckaroo stars black cowboy singer Herb Jeffries, here billed as Herbert Jeffrey.

Plot
Cowboy Bob Blake receives a letter from his friend Joe Jackson, asking for help. Blake and his men travel to Jackson's ranch, only to discover from Jackson's sister Betty that Joe has been missing for three weeks. Meanwhile, Jackson's ranch hand (Slim Perkins) is learning to use ventriloquism to make the farm animals talk, and tries to convince the gullible Dusty to buy a talking mule. 
 
Blake discovers that Jackson is being held by a local land grabbing rancher, Buck Thorne, who (with his partner Pete) has discovered gold on Jackson's ranch. They killed Joe's and Betty's father, and are trying to force Joe to deed the land over to Thorne. Blake develops a plan to rescue Jackson from where he is being held above the saloon, but runs into trouble. Betty sends Blake's men into the saloon as backup and is kidnapped by Thorne, who then threatens to kill Betty and Joe if they do not sign the deed. While Dusty rides for the sheriff, Blake and his men backtrack Betty's horse (who arrived home riderless). A gun battle ensues, with the sheriff arriving in the nick of time. The villains are hauled off to jail, and Blake rides into the sunset with Betty.

Cast
Herb Jeffries as Bob Blake
Artie Young as Betty Jackson
Rollie Hardin as Joe Jackson
Clarence Brooks as Buck Thorne
F. E. Miller as Slim Perkins
Lucius Brooks as Dusty
Spencer Williams as Pete
Lee Calmes as Lee
Earle Morris as Bartender
The Four Tones as Singing Quartet

Soundtrack
 Herb Jeffries - "I'm a Happy Cowboy"
 The patrons - "Almost Time for Roundup"
 Herb Jeffries and The Four Tones - "Got the Payday Blues"
 The Four Tones - "Get Along Mule"

External links

1939 films
American black-and-white films
1939 Western (genre) films
Race films
American Western (genre) films
Films directed by Richard C. Kahn
1930s English-language films
1930s American films